Alfenus is a genus of jumping spiders.

The two species were described by Eugène Simon in the early 1900s, based on a single male specimen each. However, the two species are so different that they probably do not belong to the same genus (Szűts & Scharff, 2005).

Alfenus calamistratus has a characteristic hairy appearance.

The males (no females have been observed yet) are 7 (A. chrysophaeus) to 9 millimeters (A. calamistratum) long, with a dark brown carapace. The hairs on A. calamistratum are white or brownish-orange.

Species
 Alfenus calamistratus Simon, 1902 – Congo basin
 Alfenus chrysophaeus Simon, 1903 – Equatorial Guinea or Cameroon

References

 Szűts, T. & Scharff, N. (2005): Redescriptions of little known jumping spider genera (Araneae: Salticidae) from West Africa. Acta zoologica hungarica 51(4):357-378. PDF (with drawings)

Salticidae genera
Spiders of Africa
Salticidae